Baur's leaf-toed gecko (Phyllodactylus baurii) is a species of lizard in the family Phyllodactylidae. The species is endemic to the Galápagos Islands.

Etymology
The specific name, baurii, is in honor of German herpetologist Georg Baur.

Geographic range
P. baurii is found on Charles Island, including its islets Champion and Enderby, and on Hood Island.

Habitat
The preferred natural habitat of P. baurii is shrubland.

Description
Dorsally, it is brownish gray, with dark brown markings. Ventrally, it is yellowish white, with minute dark brown dots.

Reproduction
P. baurii is oviparous.

References

Further reading
Garman S (1892). "The Reptiles of the Galapagos Islands. From the Collection of Dr. Geo. Baur". Bulletin of the Essex Institute 24: 73–87. (Phyllodactylus baurii, new species, pp. 82–83).
Rösler H (2000). "Kommentierte Liste der rezent, subrezent und fossil bekannten Geckotaxa (Reptilia: Gekkonomorpha)". Gekkota 2: 28–153. (Phyllodactylus baurii, p. 103). (in German).
Torres-Carvajal O, Rodríguez-Guerra A, Chaves JA (2016). "Present diversity of Galápagos leaf-toed geckos (Phyllodactylidae: Phyllodactylus) stems from three independent colonization events". Molecular Phylogenetics and Evolution 103: 1–5.
Van Denburgh J (1912). "Expedition of the California Academy of Sciences to the Galapagos Islands, 1905–1906. VI. The Geckos of the Galapagos Archipelago". Proceedings of the California Academy of Sciences, Fourth Series 1: 405–430. (Phyllodactylus baurii, pp. 426–430).

Phyllodactylus
Endemic reptiles of the Galápagos Islands
Reptiles of Ecuador
Reptiles described in 1892
Taxa named by Samuel Garman